Mario Caserini (26 February 1874 – 17 November 1920) was an Italian film director, as well as an actor, screenwriter, and early pioneer of film making in the early portion of the 20th century. Caserini was born in Rome, Italy, and was married to early 20th-century Italian actress Maria Caserini. His 1906 film Otello is believed to be the earliest film adaptation of the William Shakespeare play Othello.

Filmography

Director

Il romanzo di un Pierrot (1906)
Otello (1906) — (based on Othello)
 (1907)
Garibaldi (1907) — (film about Giuseppe Garibaldi)
 (1908) — (based on Hamlet)
 (1908) — (film about Joan of Arc)
 (1908) — (based on Romeo and Juliet)
Beatrice Cenci (1909) — (film about Beatrice Cenci)
 (1909) — (film about Bianca Cappello)
 (1909)
L'innominato (1909)
Macbeth (1909) — (based on Macbeth)
 (1909)
 (1909) — (film about Percival)
La signora de Monserau (1909) — (based on La Dame de Monsoreau)
 (1909) — (based on The Three Musketeers)
Wanda Soldanieri (1909)
 (1910) — (based on Hamlet)
L'amorino (1910)
Anita Garibaldi (1910) — (film about Anita Garibaldi)
Catilina (1910) — (film about Catiline)
 (1910) — (based on Le Cid)
Cola di Rienzo (1910) — (film about Cola di Rienzo)
 (1910) — (film about the Battle of Legnano)
 (1910) — (film about Joanna the Mad)
 (1910) — (film about Giovanni dalle Bande Nere)
Lucia di Lammermoor (1910) — (based on Lucia di Lammermoor)
 (1910) — (film about Lucrezia Borgia)
 (1910) — (film about Messalina)
 (1911)
Antigone (1911) — (based on Antigone)
Mademoiselle de Scudery (1911) — (based on Mademoiselle de Scuderi)
 (1911)
Arabian Infamy (1912)
 (1912)
 (1912)
 (1912)
 (1912)
 (1912)
 (1912) — (film about Percival)
 (1912) — (based on The Pilgrim's Progress)
La ribalta (1912)
 (1912) — (based on Mam'zelle Nitouche)
 (1912) — (based on the Nibelungenlied)
 (1912)
 (1913) — (film about Dante and Beatrice)
Floretta and Patapon (1913)
The Last Days of Pompeii (1913) — (based on The Last Days of Pompeii)
Love Everlasting (1913)
Il treno degli spettri (1913)
 (1914)
 (1914) — (film about Nero and Agrippina)
Nidia la cieca (1914)
Monna Vanna (1915)
 (1915)
Amor enemigo (1916)
Como aquel día (1916)
La divetta del reggimento (1916)
Flor de otoño (1916)
 (1916)
Madame Guillotine (1916) — (film about Thérésa Tallien)
 (1916)
Pero tu amor me redime (1916)
La vida y la muerte (1916)
 (1917)
Il filo della vita (1917)
 (1917)
¿Quién me hará olvidar sin morir? (1917)
 (1917) — (based on Resurrection)
 (1918)
Captain Fracasse (1919) — (based on Captain Fracasse)
Primerose (1919)
Tortured Soul (1919)
 (1920)
 (1921)

Actor
Il romanzo di un Pierrot (1906)
Otello (1906)
 (1908)
Wanda Soldanieri (1909)
Como aquel día (1916)

Screenwriter
The Last Days of Pompeii (1913)
Como aquel día (1916)
Flor de otoño (1916)
Captain Fracasse (1919)

External links

1909 Macbeth information
Cinema e Medioevo - Locandine e schede
Italian Cinema: Arthouse to Exploitation

1874 births
1920 deaths
Film directors from Rome
Articles containing video clips